Failure in the intelligence cycle or intelligence failure, is the outcome of the inadequacies within the intelligence cycle. The intelligence cycle itself consists of six steps that are constantly in motion. The six steps 
are: requirements, collection, processing and exploitation, analysis and production, dissemination and consumption, and feedback.

Collection 
The collection of intelligence is through five methods: Human Intelligence (HUMINT), Signals Intelligence (SIGINT), Image Intelligence (IMINT), Open Source Intelligence (OSINT), and Measures and Signature Intelligence (MASINT). It is common to rely on technology when performing collection, however it can fail and cause more problems than it solves.

Failures in collection

SIGINT 
Signals intelligence is the information collected via the interception of signals. Signals intelligence can further be broken down into Communications Intelligence (COMINT), Electronic Intelligence (ELINT), Telemetry Intelligence (TELINT), and Radar Transmitters (RADINT). While these systems have their strengths, such as the ability to intercept communication or to gain information about weapons systems, they also have their weaknesses.

COMINT 
Gaining accurate communications intelligence can be achieved but more often than not, the adversary will not communicate in such a way that would allow the information to be intercepted easily. The classic case of communications intelligence failure is Operation Gold during the Cold War where the Central Intelligence Agency and the British Secret Intelligence Service planned to tap landline communications to the Soviet Army headquarters in Berlin. The Soviets were alerted to the plan by a mole within the SIS and they allowed the operation to go forward. The information that was given out via the tap was disinformation by the Soviets. Thus leading to a failure in the intelligence itself.

Another setback in communication intelligence is code breaking. This falls into two categories: verbal codes, and transmitted codes. For an analyst listening to an intercepted phone call, the process of gaining information may seem simple. However, the situation becomes complicated when the individuals begin to use "slang" or colloquialisms in their conversation. What seems like a harmless conversation could prove dangerous. Furthermore, the calls themselves may be encrypted as well, further complicating the problem. Secondly, there is the issue of transmitted information being encoded. Lowenthal states in collection portion of his book that codebreakers like to boast that any code that can be created can be solved, but the public has access to increasingly stronger cipher programs now and these programs are harder to break.

ELINT, TELINT, RADINT 
These three "ints" relate to each other and separate discussion of them would be pointless. Simple procedures can be taken to reduce the chances of information being received by a gathering method. As was mentioned before with communication, test data or telemetry data can be encoded before it is sent. It can also be encapsulated and released for pick up.

IMINT 
Imagery intelligence refers to information gathered by planes, unmanned aerial vehicles (UAV), and satellites.

Satellites 
Causes of failures to gain intelligence via satellites included meteorological and human.

Matters of weather play a large role in IMINT failure. While radar imaging can see through clouds, it is unlikely that a general satellite sweep could find something buried under a few feet of snow or in a frozen lake. Another problem with satellite imagery is that it is a simple snapshot in time. If the satellite that captures the image is not in a geo-synchronous orbit, there is a risk of the target not being there when the satellite passes over the area again. There is also the possibility of camouflage. For example, the entrance to an underground bunker may be camouflaged with foliage and it would take an arduous examination of the image to find the information needed.  Another potential failure is a satellite being unavailable at the time needed because it is being used for other intelligence purposes, and the situation or event of interest is missed.  Images can also be misinterpreted, generating misleading information and potentially supporting a bad decision.

Airplanes and UAV's 
Airplanes and UAVs can respond quicker to requests for data collection than satellites. They have fewer issues of failure, however their failures tend to be greater in magnitude. Intelligence failure with planes and UAVs: if the craft is sent to the wrong destination then it is unlikely that the information will be collected. If the aircraft is destroyed during the mission, unless information was being transmitted at the time, then data is lost.

OSINT 
Open source information is derived from newspapers, journals, radio and television, and the Internet. There is a growing emphasis on the use of OSINT however, there are several points where collection via OSINT can fail.

Information Reliability 
Source reliability is one of the major points that hinders collection with this method. If you are viewing the paper of country where the dictator government runs the media, it is unlikely that you are reading an unbiased account of the facts. The same thing applies to use of the internet to gain information. Censorship controls over the internet in some countries will limit the amount of information that is made available.

Issues with Analysts 
From the standpoint of the analyst themselves, there are also issues regarding the use of OSINT. Most individuals scan a webpage for the information they need and if it is not there, they move on. This transfers to the analytic community as well. Secondly, it is hard for an analyst to get information via the internet when most analysts lack the use of the internet in their agencies. Thirdly, the volume of data alone is often too much for an analyst to sift through causing important knowledge to slip by.

MASINT 
Measurement and Signature Intelligence (MASINT) is scientific and technical intelligence information obtained by quantitative and qualitative analysis of data (metric, angle, spatial, wavelength, time dependence, modulation, plasma, and hydromagnetic) derived from specific technical sensors for the purpose of identifying any distinctive features associated with the source, emitter, or sender and to facilitate subsequent identification and/or measurement of the same.

Points of failure for MASINT 
MASINT is hardly understood by most analysts or the decision makers that look at it and that in itself is one of its major drawbacks. It also suffers from finance issues due to the expensive nature of the items needed to do the actual collection itself. Lastly, the exploitation, and analysis often take longer due to the need for highly trained analysts to examine the information.

Processing and exploitation 
Processing and exploitation involves converting the vast amount of information collected to a form usable by analysts. This is done through a variety of methods including decryption, language translation, and data reduction. Processing includes the entering
of raw data into databases where it can be exploited for use in the analysis process.

Failures in processing 
The problem within this step of the process is that there is often too much information and not enough analysts to process it. This leads to large amounts of information that was collected never being utilized because it does not meet the exact needs for the collection requirement. Thus important data may be cast aside and never used even though it may be relevant again at a later date.

Analysis and production 
Analysts are the voice of the Intelligence Community. Therefore, the analysis that they perform is expected to be accurate on a regular basis. Failure in analysis can be approached from two points of view: the tactical/operational point of view and the analysts point of view.

Tactical/operational 
A problem occurs when looking at current issues versus long-term issues. Ideally the tasking should be 50/50 so that no one type of issue gets more analysis than the other. In an ever-changing world there is a tendency to place more emphasis on tactical/current issues. This hinders the operational/long term issues by putting analysis of them off in favor of current issues.

Analysts 
The tasking itself is not the only way in which analysis can fail. The human component of analysis is just as important. One of the leading causes of analyst failure is cognitive bias. Cognitive biases are mental errors caused by our simplified information processing strategies. In other words, a cognitive bias does not result from any emotional or intellectual predisposition toward a certain judgment, but rather from subconscious mental procedures for processing information. These biases can occur not only with a single analyst but to an entire office of them, leading to a biased form of "groupthink". Other forms of bias such as cultural, organizational, or bias from the analysts self-interest and need to succeed. The need to succeed coupled with the level of competition within the community to get their analysis on the desk of a top decision maker. Another point of failure is with the training of the analysts or the lack of. The "Commission on the Intelligence Capabilities of the United States Regarding Weapons of Mass Destruction Report to the President of the United States" found that there is a lack of analysts with the proper scientific or technological training needed to perform proper analysis, thus contributing to failure of analysis.

Dissemination and consumption 
When the decision maker receives a report from an analyst and reviews it, this process is referred to as dissemination and consumption. In the intelligence community, there are several types of documents that get disseminated regularly. For example, the Presidents Daily Brief (PDB) is a document that is disseminated to the president of the United States on a daily basis and includes the recent information on important matters. The goal of dissemination is simple, get the information that is relevant to the decision maker in a timely fashion while being accurate.

Failures in dissemination 
Perhaps the greatest failure in dissemination of information is the failure to get the information to the proper decision maker. A report on crop futures in Burkina Faso would not be of interest to the Secretary of Education for example. Another issue to consider for the crop report would be if it is important enough to report. If the information does not meet a certain requirement there is a chance that it will not be reported. However, if it is important enough to report, how quickly should it be reported? If the information is time sensitive but it is not disseminated in enough time to have the desired effect then the process fails. Compartmentalization, either in isolation of planners from flow of intelligence or invocation of need to know among analysts, strongly contributes to failures in dissemination.

Feedback 
Feedback is the last step in the intelligence process. The goal of the feedback part of the cycle is to give feedback to the analysts about the quality of the product they produced.

Failures in feedback 
The main failure when it comes to feedback is when the decision maker fails to offer it to the analyst. It is possible for there to be feedback failure even if feedback is offered. This occurs when the decision maker fails to get the feedback to the analyst in a timely order that would assist in the production of the next report to them.

See also 
 Bias
 Conformity
 In-group bias
 Institutional bias
 self-serving bias

References 

National security
Intelligence assessment